The Birmingham Iron were a professional American football franchise based in Birmingham, Alabama, and one of the eight members of the Alliance of American Football (AAF), which played one season from February 2019 to April 2019. They played their home games at Legion Field. The Iron were coached by former National Football League player and coach Tim Lewis. Trey Brown was the executive vice president of football operations and Joe Pendry was the general manager.

On April 2, 2019, the league's football operations were reportedly suspended, and on April 4 the league allowed players to leave their contracts to sign with NFL teams. The league filed for Chapter 7 bankruptcy on April 17, 2019.

History
The team was announced as a charter team of the Alliance of American Football on June 4, 2018. The team's first head coach was announced on June 6 as Tim Lewis, his first job at the position. On September 20, the league announced four eastern inaugural franchises' names and logos, including Birmingham as the Birmingham Iron. The name is a tribute to the city's iron industry, while the team colors of black, dark grey, and light grey were based on iron ore, coal, and flux, the components used to make steel.

The final 52-man roster was set on January 30, 2019. The team's first game was at home against the Memphis Express on February 10, 2019, when the Iron registered their first win and the first shutout in league history.

On March 31, the Iron clinched a playoff berth with a win against Atlanta, though the playoffs were never played as the league suspended football operations on April 2. The Iron finished at a 5–3 record.

Final Roster

Allocation pool
The team's assigned area, which designated player rights, included the following:

Colleges
 Alabama
 Alabama A&M
 Alabama State
 Auburn
 Indiana University of Pennsylvania
 Jacksonville State
 Louisiana Tech
 Maryland
 Miles College
 Mississippi State
 Missouri
 NC State
 North Alabama
 Ohio
 Samford
 South Alabama
 South Carolina
 Troy
 Tuskegee
 UAB
 West Alabama
  
National Football League (NFL)
 New England Patriots
 Buffalo Bills
 Cleveland Browns
 Pittsburgh Steelers
  
Canadian Football League (CFL)
 Montreal Alouettes
 Ottawa Redblacks

Staff

Notable Former Players 

 Chris Davis - Former Auburn Tigers Defensive Back
 J. C. Hassenauer - Current Pittsburgh Steelers Center
 Nick Novak - Former 12 Year NFL Veteran
 Trent Richardson - Former Cleveland Browns Running Back, 2012 4th Overall Pick

2019 season

Final standings

Schedule

Preseason

Regular season
All times Central

 Changed from original time and/or network

Postseason

Game summaries

Week 1: Memphis

The Iron began their season at home against the Express.  In the first quarter, the Iron scored when Nick Novak kicked a 29-yard field goal to make it 3–0.  They would increase their lead in the second quarter when Novak kicked 28-yard and 47-yard field goals to make it 6–0 and then 9–0 at halftime.  After a scoreless third quarter, the Iron managed to pull away from the Express after Trent Richardson ran for a 4-yard touchdown to make it 17–0.  This would be followed by Novak's fourth field goal attempt of the day in which he kicked a 32-yarder to make it 20–0.  Finally, Richardson ran for his second touchdown of the game from 5 yards out (with a failed 2-point conversion) to make the final score 26–0.

With the win (their first as a franchise), the Iron started their season 1–0.

Week 2: Salt Lake

After a huge shut out win, the Iron stayed home for Week 2 against the Stallions.  It was all Stallions in the first half after both teams failed to score in the first quarter.  In the second quarter, the Stallions made it 6–0 when Joel Bouagnon ran for a 3-yard touchdown (with a failed 2-point conversion).  They made it 9–0 at halftime when Taylor Bertolet kicked a 53-yard field goal.  The Iron managed to get on the board in the third quarter when Shaheed Salmon recovered a fumble in the end zone for a touchdown (with a failed 2-point conversion) to make it 9–6.  In the fourth quarter, the Iron were able to make the comeback as Trent Richardson ran for 3-yard touchdown to make the final score 12–9.

With the win, the Iron improved to 2–0.

Week 3: at Atlanta

After the tough home win, the Iron went on the road to face the Legends.  After a scoreless first quarter, the Legends scored first when Younghoe Koo kicked a 21-yard field goal to make it 3–0.  The Iron tied it up when Nick Novak kicked a 39-yard field goal to make it 3–3.  They moved into the lead when Trent Richardson ran for a 5-yard touchdown (with a failed 2-point conversion) to make it 9–3.  The Legends however drew closer when Koo kicked a 35-yard field goal to make it 9–6 at halftime.  After the break, the Iron moved back ahead by 6 when Novak kicked a 27-yard field goal to make it 12–6.  They would move ahead by double digits when Richardson ran for a 1-yard touchdown to make it 20–6.  In the fourth quarter, the Iron pulled further away when Richardson ran for yet another touchdown to make it 28–6.  The Legends wrapped up the scoring of the game when Matt Sims found Montay Crockett on a 23-yard pass (with a failed 2-point conversion) to make the final score 28–12.

With the win, the Iron improved to 3–0.

Week 4: San Antonio

After a tough road win, the Iron returned home for a game against the Commanders.  In the first quarter, the Commanders scored first when Nick Rose kicked a 39-yard field goal to make it 3–0 for the only score.  The Iron tied it up in the second quarter when Nick Novak kicked a 33-yard field goal to make it 3–3 at halftime.  The Commanders got back into the lead in the third quarter when Trey Williams ran for a 12-yard touchdown (with a failed 2-point conversion) to make it 9–3.  They increased their lead in the fourth quarter when Rose kicked a 20-yard field goal to make it 12–3.  Later on in the quarter, the Iron came within a point when Trent Richardson ran for a 1-yard touchdown to make it 12–11.  The Iron were able to get the ball back and try to convert a 4th-and-12 but Luis Perez was intercepted ending the game sending the Iron to their first ever loss.

With the loss, the Iron fell to 3–1 and second place in the Eastern Conference.

Week 5: Orlando

After a tough home loss, the Iron stayed home to face the undefeated Apollos.  In the first quarter, the Apollos scored first when Garrett Gilbert found Scott Orndorff on a 21-yard pass (with a failed 2-point conversion) to make it 6–0.  This would be followed by Keith Reaser returning an interception 40 yards to make it 14–0.  In the second quarter, Elliott Fry kicked a 21-yard field goal to make it 17–0.  The Iron finally got on the board when Trent Richardson ran for a 3-yard touchdown to make it 17–8.  Though, the Apollos pulled away at halftime when Fry kicked a 22-yard field goal to make it 20–8.  In the third quarter, the Iron drew closer when Keith Price found Brandon Ross on a 30-yard touchdown (with a failed 2-point conversion) to make it 20–14.  Though, the Apollos made it 23–14 by way of Fry's 27-yard field goal.  In the fourth quarter, the Apollos wrapped up the scoring of the game when Gilbert found Jalin Marshall on a 12-yard pass to make the final score 31–14.

With their second straight loss, the Iron fell to 3–2.

Week 6: at San Diego

After yet another tough loss at home, the Iron traveled west to take on the Fleet.  In the first quarter, the Fleet scored first when Donny Hageman kicked a 36-yard field goal to make it 3–0.  The Iron took the lead later on in the quarter when Luis Perez found Trent Richardson on a 13-yard pass (with a failed 2-point conversion) to make it 6–3.  In the second quarter, the Iron increased their lead when Perez found L'Damian Washington on an 83-yard pass (with another failed 2-point conversion) to make it 12–3.  The Fleet drew closer when Mike Bercovici found Ben Johnson on a 1-yard pass (with a failed 2-point conversion) to make it 12–9.  Nick Novak came out to kick a 23-yard field goal to help the Iron to a 15–9 lead at halftime.  In the third quarter, the Iron went back ahead by double-digits as Richardson ran for a 2-yard touchdown (with yet another failed 2-point conversion) to make it 21–9.  However, the Fleet would score two straight times to retake the lead:  Terrell Watson would run for a 2-yard touchdown to make it 21–17, followed up by Bercovici finding Watson on a 12-yard pass (with a failed 2-point conversion) to make it 23–21.  In the fourth quarter, however, the Iron took the lead back when Perez found Washington again, this time on a 23-yard pass to make it 29–21.  Then, the Fleet would tie it up at 29–29, after Bercovici found Francis Owusu on a 13-yard pass.  The Iron completed the comeback with no time left in the game as Novak kicked the game-winning 44-yard field goal to make the final score 32–29.

With the win, the Iron improved to 4–2.

Week 7: at Memphis

After a tough road win, the Iron traveled again to take on the Express.  In the first quarter, the Iron scored first when Luiz Perez found Braedon Bowman on an 11-yard pass to make it 8-0.  In the second quarter, the Express tied it up when Terrence Magee ran for a 1-yard touchdown to make it 8-8.  Trent Richardson then got the Iron ahead at halftime when he ran for a 1-yard touchdown to make it 16-8.  In the third quarter, the Iron increased their lead when Nick Novak kicked a 28-yard field goal to make it 19-8.  Though, the Express drew closer when Terrell Bonds blocked a punt and returned it 50 yards for a touchdown (with a failed 2-point conversion) to make it 19-14.  In the fourth quarter, the Iron moved ahead by double digits again when Perez found Wes Saxton on a 4-yard pass (with a failed 2-point conversion) to make it 25-14.  Though, the Express would score 2 straight times to tie the game up and force overtime when Austin MacGinnis kicked a 22-yard field goal to make it 25-17 and then Brandon Silvers found Reece Horn on a 7-yard pass to make it 25-25.  In overtime, Silvers found Dan Williams on a 10-yard pass to make it 31-25 for the Express comeback win.

With the loss, the Iron fell to 4-3.

Week 8: Atlanta

After a tough loss, the Iron returned home for their final home game of the season against the Legends. Another distraction came when minority owner Mark Jennings announced he had sold his shares in the Iron just three days before the game. In the first quarter, the Legends scored first when Younghoe Koo kicked a 33-yard field goal to make it 3-0.  In the second quarter, the Iron tied the game up when Nick Novak kicked a 35-yard field goal to make it 3-3.  They would take the lead when Trent Richardson ran for a 2-yard touchdown to make it 11-3.  Though the Legends drew closer when Koo kicked a 31-yard field goal to make it 11-6 at halftime.  In the third quarter, the Iron pulled away when Novak kicked a 37-yard field goal to make it 14-6.  Though, the Legends came within 5 again when Koo kicked a 35-yard field goal to make it 14-9.  In the fourth quarter, the Iron moved back ahead and eventually won by 8 when Novak kicked a 28-yard field goal to make the final score 17-9.

With the win, the Iron were able to seal the second playoff spot and improve to 5-3.

Media
In addition to league-wide television coverage through CBS, NFL Network, CBS Sports Network, TNT, and B/R Live, Birmingham's games were also broadcast on local radio by WERC (AM).

References

Further reading
 

 
2018 establishments in Alabama
2019 disestablishments in Alabama